Kéniéba is a small town and seat of the commune of Benkadi Habaladougou in the Cercle of Kangaba in the Koulikoro Region of south-western Mali.

References

Populated places in Koulikoro Region